is a railway station in Fushimi-ku, Kyoto, Japan.

Lines

Kintetsu Railway
Kyoto Line

Building
The station has one platform and four tracks.

Platforms

History
1940 - The station opens as a station of Nara Electric Railroad
1963 - NER merges and the station becomes part of Kintetsu
1999 - Passing lines are completed
2007 - Starts using PiTaPa

Surroundings
Kuzabashi Street
Aburakoji Street
Nintendo
Yasaka Bus Depot
Kyoto Bus Rakunan Office

Adjacent stations

References

External links

 Station Facilities and Service
 station Map

Railway stations in Kyoto
Railway stations in Japan opened in 1940